The 1976 New Orleans Saints season was the Saints’ tenth year in the National Football League (NFL). Hoping past success could influence the franchise, the Saints hired Hank Stram as the new head coach. However, in Stram's first season at the helm, the Saints continued to struggle finishing with a 4–10 record. The Saints made a uniform change before the year, going from a dark gold to old gold, and have retained the color albeit with minor shading changes since. It was also the team's first season wearing black pants, a move which was not unexpected, since Stram outfitted the Kansas City Chiefs in red pants beginning in 1968.

New Orleans' hopes for success was severely diminished before the season began when Stram learned star quarterback Archie Manning would not be able to play at all due to offseason elbow surgery. This forced Stram to alternate between longtime backup Bobby Scott and Chicago Bears castoff Bobby Douglass.

The high point of the season was in week three, when Stram’s Saints traveled to Kansas City and defeated the Chiefs 27–17. Stram rubbed salt in the wounds of the team he coached for 15 seasons (1960 to 1974) and led to the Super Bowl IV championship when Scott threw a touchdown pass on the game's final play to Tinker Owens. Chiefs coach Paul Wiggin refused to shake hands with Stram, who was carried off the Arrowhead Stadium turf by his players upon orders by the coach.

Offseason

NFL draft

Personnel

Staff

Roster

Regular season

Schedule

Standings

References

External links 
 1976 New Orleans Saints at Pro-Football-Reference.com

New Orleans Saints
New Orleans Saints seasons
New Orl